The Neil Young Archives is a longtime project by singer-songwriter Neil Young. It started as a series of archival releases featuring previously released as well as unreleased studio and live recordings. It eventually developed into a website featuring almost the whole of Young's recording output throughout his career, available for streaming in high resolution audio format. The project has been long in the making – work began in the late 1980s. Throughout its development, Young himself has made several statements about the material included, release dates, and marketing that have proven false as the project was modified for new multimedia formats and expanded upon to accommodate new releases or other relevant material. Young has said that there will be five volumes covering approximately 50 years.

The archives are divided into several series. The main series consists of several volumes of box sets, each covering a separate period of the artist's career. The Performance Series consists of individual releases of live material, each representing a specific show or tour. Finally, there is the Special Release Series, which consists of previously unreleased albums. These different series also overlap; for example, two volumes of the Performance Series that are included on the each of the first two Archives box set releases are also available separately. Homegrown is also included in its entirety on Neil Young Archives Volume II: 1972–1976 but was also released on its own earlier in 2020.

As of 2019, Young has launched a subscription website and application where all of his music is available to stream in high resolution audio. The Neil Young Archives also include his newspaper, The Times-Contrarian; The Hearse Theater, which shows limited runs of concert films and rare footage; and photos and memorabilia throughout his career.

Box sets

Volume I: 1963–1972
The first volume, The Archives Vol. 1 1963–1972, was released on June 2, 2009. Covering Young's early years with The Squires and Buffalo Springfield, it also includes cuts, demos, outtakes and alternate versions of songs from his albums Neil Young, Everybody Knows This Is Nowhere, After the Gold Rush, and Harvest, as well as tracks he recorded with both Crazy Horse and Crosby, Stills, Nash & Young during this time. Also included in the set are several live discs, as well as (on the Blu-Ray/DVD versions) a copy of the long out-of-print film Journey Through the Past, directed by Young in the early 1970s.

Volume I was released as a set of 10 Blu-ray discs in order to present high resolution audio as well as accompanying visual documentation. It is also available as a 10 disc DVD set and an 8 disc CD set. On January 31, 2010, the box set won the Grammy Award for Best Art Direction on a Boxed or Special Limited Edition Package, and was shared by Neil Young along with his art directors Gary Burden and Jenice Heo.

Volume II: 1972–1976

Similar in scope to the first box set, Neil Young Archives Volume II: 1972–1976 was officially released as a deluxe box set and for streaming on the Neil Young Archives site on November 20, 2020. Covering Young's work with The Stray Gators, Santa Monica Flyers, Crosby, Stills, Nash & Young, Crazy Horse, and The Stills-Young Band during this period, Vol. II includes album cuts, demos, outtakes and alternate versions of songs from his albums Time Fades Away, Tonight’s the Night, On the Beach, Zuma, and Long May You Run, as well as the recently released album Homegrown in its entirety and tracks from CSNY's multiple sessions for their aborted Human Highway album. Also as with Volume I, included in the set are several live discs, including the unreleased live album Odeon Budokan. Volume II was released as a set of 10 CDs (with a deluxe edition containing a hardbound book), and did not have accompanying Blu-ray or DVD editions as Vol. I did due to, as Young has explained, “economic reasons.”

Volume III: 1976–1980s 
Young has stated in a message on the NYA site on September 15, 2022, that Volume III is tentatively scheduled for release in 2023. The website for Young's Living with War album contains several live recordings of songs from Life, which the page cites as being "From The Neil Young Archives, Volume 3".

Volume IV (1990s)
Volume IV will feature tracks from the 1990s.

Volume V (2000s)
Elliot Roberts and Young have said that the Archives project will extend into a fifth volume, which will feature material from the 21st century.

Performance Series
The series of box sets were preceded by individual concert releases, dubbed the Archives Performance Series. This section contains details of releases so far. The releases are ordered in chronological order of recording. The albums were released in a different order, with Volume 2 coming in 2006, Volume 3 in 2007 and Volume 1 included in the first Archives box.

1960s 
Volume 00: Sugar Mountain – Live at Canterbury House 1968

Sugar Mountain - Live at Canterbury House 1968 is labeled Volume 00 in the Performance Series, but was the third in the series to be released. It features recordings from Young's solo acoustic performances at Canterbury House on 9–10 November 1968. The album was released on December 2, 2008.

Volume 01: Live at the Riverboat 1969

Volume 1 is entitled Live at the Riverboat 1969 and is taken from a series of shows at the Riverboat Coffeehouse in Toronto in February 1969, recorded by Brian Ahern. The CD was released as part of the Archives Vol. I: 1963-1972 box set in June 2009. Chrome Dreams II from certain retailers also included a bonus CD with a preview track from the Riverboat. Different outlets had different CDs, each with a different preview track.

1970s 
Volume 02: Live at the Fillmore East 1970

Live at the Fillmore East, released in November 2006, features a March 1970 concert with Crazy Horse. The album was released on CD, LP and DVD with high definition 24/96 sound accompanied by still images from the concert. This album was also included as part of the Archives Vol. I: 1963-1972 box set.

Volume 02.5: Live at the Cellar Door

Live at the Cellar Door was recorded in Washington D.C. during six-show between November 30 and December 2, 1970. This was released on December 10, 2013.

Volume 03: Live at Massey Hall 1971

A solo acoustic performance from January 1971, Live at Massey Hall 1971, saw release in March 2007. The album was released on LP, CD and DVD Video with the DVD version including high definition sound accompanied by 8mm film footage, which sourced from the Stratford, Connecticut, concert three days later (January 22, 1971). This album was also included as part of the Archives Vol. I: 1963-1972 box set.

Volume 03.5: Young Shakespeare

Young Shakespeare was released on March 26, 2021. It is an all-acoustic solo show and recorded at the Shakespeare Theatre in Stratford, Connecticut, on January 22, 1971, just three days after the Massey Hall show. After talks of it possibly being paired with the 50th Anniversary Edition of After the Gold Rush, it was officially available as a stand-alone release along with a companion concert film, which had previously been used for Massey Halls accompanying DVD release.

Volume 04: Tuscaloosa

Tuscaloosa is a live album featuring recordings from the concert in Tuscaloosa, Alabama on the 1973 tour with The Stray Gators, during which Time Fades Away was recorded. The album was released on June 7, 2019. Young has since stated on his Archives website that Tuscaloosa is "as close as Time Fades Away II that we'll get." This album was also included as part of the Archives Vol. II: 1972-1976 box set.

Volume 05: Roxy: Tonight's the Night Live 1973

Roxy: Tonight's the Night Live was released on April 24, 2018, with a Record Store Day vinyl release on April 21. The album is culled from a set of shows played during the opening of the Roxy Theatre from September 20–22, 1973. The shows featured Young backed by the Santa Monica Flyers and songs from the recently recorded Tonight's the Night. This album was also included as part of the Archives Vol. II: 1972-1976 box set with an additional performance of "The Losing End" not present on the original release.

Volume 06: Odeon Budokan

An unreleased live album featuring recordings from the 1976 shows at Budokan Hall, Tokyo and Hammersmith Odeon, London with Crazy Horse, Odeon Budokan was released as part of the Neil Young Archives Vol. II: 1972-1976 box set on November 20, 2020. It had been temporarily scheduled for a stand-alone release in 2019, but was delayed in favor of Tuscaloosa.

Volume 07: Songs for Judy

Songs for Judy was released digitally and on CD on November 30, 2018, and as a double LP on December 14, 2018. Compiled by Joel Bernstein and Cameron Crowe from solo acoustic performances on the 1976 North American tour, it previously circulated among fans as a bootleg titled The Bernstein Tapes.

Volume 08

Catalogue number possibly reserved for Boarding House, an album compiled from the recordings made during Young's five-day residency at The Boarding House, San Francisco in May 1978; some of these recordings appeared on side A of Rust Never Sleeps. The album is listed on the timeline on the Archives website, although its status is currently unknown.

1980s 
Volume 09: A Treasure

A Treasure documents the International Harvesters tours of 1984–1985. It was first released May 24, 2011 as an LP, with Blu-ray (and accompanying film) and CD following June 14.

Volume 10

Catalogue possibly reserved for "Crazy Horse Garage" – a series of live in concert by Neil Young & Crazy Horse during their US concert tours in October and November 1986.

Volume 11: Bluenote Café

Bluenote Café, released November 13, 2015, documents the 1987/88 tour with the Bluenotes behind the 1988 album This Note's for You.

1990s 
Volume 11.5: Way Down in the Rust Bucket

Way Down in the Rust Bucket was the first release from his Archives Performance Series for the year 2021, and was released in CD, DVD, vinyl and deluxe box set editions on February 26. A live show that was recorded on November 13, 1990, at the Catalyst in Santa Cruz, CA with his backing band, Crazy Horse, Young has previously shown all the concert video footage as part of the Movietone section of his Archives website.

Volume 12: Dreamin' Man Live '92

Dreamin' Man Live '92 was released on December 8, 2009, and features all ten songs from the album Harvest Moon (but in different order, locations and dates) performed live in 1992.

2000s 
Volume 16: Return to Greendale

Return to Greendale was officially released on November 6, 2020. Young has previously shown all the concert video footage as part of the Movietone section of his Archives website. The concert was held in Toronto, Canada in 2003 as the supporting tour for his album, Greendale.

Official Bootleg Series
In September 2020, Young officially announced a new series of releases called the Official Bootleg Series. The original intent behind this series was to duplicate popular bootlegs, down to their original cover art, but upgrading the audio fidelity. However, the concept changed with the first officially announced entry, Carnegie Hall, which will take its audio from the December 4th, 1970 show as opposed to the heavily circulated December 5 midnight set.

On October 7, the first six entries of the Official Bootleg Series were announced, as well as that Niko Bolas will be helping Young in the production of these releases.

An article on the Neil Young Archives site announced a target release date of September 10, 2021. The first was released on October 1, 2021.

Official Bootleg Series 01:
Carnegie Hall was officially released on October 1, 2021. It features all 23 songs recorded during the December 4, 1970 show as opposed to the heavily circulated December 5 midnight set.
Official Bootleg Series 02:
High Flyin  is a recording of several of the Ducks' Bay Area shows from their August 1977 run and is scheduled for release in April 2023. and were professionally recorded with Young's analog truck.Official Bootleg Series 03:"I'm Happy That Y'all Came Down" was released on May 6, 2022. It features a show from February 1, 1971.Official Bootleg Series 04:Royce Hall was released on May 6, 2022. It features a show from January 30, 1971, the source for both "The Needle and the Damage Done" from Harvest and "Love in Mind" from Time Fades Away.Official Bootleg Series 05:Citizen Kane Jr. Blues was released on May 6, 2022. It features a show from May 16, 1974, a legendary show in Young's career.Official Bootleg Series 06:Somewhere Under the Rainbow: November 5th, 1973: a heavily bootlegged show featuring the Santa Monica Flyers. It was put up to a fan vote as a potential official release before this series was announced, and is scheduled for release in April 2023.

Official Release Series
Although the Archives label is predominantly used for previously unreleased material, the name is also being attached to remastered editions of existing albums. Such releases are labeled Neil Young Archives Official Release Series. Since the introduction of PonoMusic, the following albums have been re-released as part of the Official Release Series:Official Release Series 01:Neil YoungOfficial Release Series 02:Everybody Knows This Is NowhereOfficial Release Series 03:After the Gold RushOfficial Release Series 04:HarvestOfficial Release Series 05:Time Fades AwayOfficial Release Series 06:On the BeachOfficial Release Series 07:Tonight's the NightOfficial Release Series 08:ZumaOfficial Release Series 08.5:Long May You RunOfficial Release Series 09:American Stars 'n BarsOfficial Release Series 10:Comes a TimeOfficial Release Series 11:Rust Never SleepsOfficial Release Series 12:Live RustOfficial Release Series 13:Hawks & DovesOfficial Release Series 14:Re·ac·torOfficial Release Series 20:This Note's For YouOfficial Release Series 21:Eldorado (EP)Official Release Series 30:Dead Man (soundtrack)
Compact disc versions of the first four above albums were released on 14 July 2009. In addition, the albums were reissued as limited edition box sets on 24 November 2009, in both 180-gram vinyl and 24k gold CD versions. 140-gram vinyl editions of the individual albums were also issued on that date. On the 28th of November 2014, the series no. 05-08 were also reissued as limited edition vinyl box sets. When the PonoMusic Store went live in the end of 2014, another six albums were reissued as digital downloads, making a total of 14 albums available in 24 Bit & 192 kHz (including the 1973 album  Time Fades Away, which hadn't been officially re-released before then).

Digital Masterpiece Series
In 2003, Neil Young released On the Beach, American Stars 'N Bars, Hawks & Doves, and Re·ac·tor on compact disc for the first time.  These were reissued as HDCDs as part of the Neil Young Archives Digital Masterpiece Series.  The CD versions were subsequently joined by DVD-Audio versions.

Special Release Series
Neil Young has also announced a part of the archives known as the Special Release Series. Toast, an album recorded in 2000 with Crazy Horse, was the first album to be announced as being part of the Special Release Series. Though announced in 2008, Toast remained unreleased until July 8, 2022. It was then announced that The Archives Vol. II would include four SRS releases: the studio albums Homegrown, Chrome Dreams and Oceanside/Countryside, and the live album Odeon-Budokan. Homegrown was released standalone in June 2020, before Odeon Budokan was released as part of Neil Young Archives Vol. II: 1972-1976. Chrome Dreams and Oceanside/Countryside are scheduled for a future release.Volume 02: HomegrownHomegrown, a long lost unreleased 1975 album, was finally announced for a release in early 2020. Originally scheduled for release on April 17 as part of that year's Record Store Day, it was delayed until June 19 due to the COVID-19 pandemic.Volume 05: HitchhikerHitchhiker features an entirely solo 1976 session at Indigo Ranch Recording Studio in Malibu, California, possibly intended for release in the late 1970s but rejected by Reprise at the time. It was released on September 8, 2017,  becoming the first officially released SRS volume.Volume 09: ToastToast, a shelved Neil Young & Crazy Horse album recorded in 2001. Released July 8, 2022. Volume 10: Original Soundtrack from "Paradox"'''Paradox was released on March 23, 2018.

 Scheduled/possible upcoming releases 
Young has mentioned many as-of-yet unreleased studio albums and live albums that he has recorded over the years, including:

 Early Daze (1969) – Everybody Knows This Is Nowhere sessions with Crazy Horse, expected 2023
 CSNY at Fillmore East (1970) – Live album with CSNY
 Oceanside-Countryside (1977) – Young describes it as "the origin of Comes a Time", and is expected to be included in The Archives Volume IIIChrome Dreams (1977)Give to the Wind Orchestra (1977) – Live album with Nicolette Larson expected to be included in The Archives Volume III Boarding House Solo (1978) – Live album expected to be included in The Archives Volume IIIJohnny’s Island (1982) – Studio album expected to be included in The Archives Volume III Old Ways I (1983) – Early version of Old Ways expected to be included in The Archives Volume III Times Square (1989) – Early version of Freedom recorded with the Restless
 Road of Plenty (1986–1989) – Live album featuring Crazy Horse, the Blue Notes, and solo performances expected to be included in The Archives Volume IIILive Freedom (1989) – Live album
 Mirror Ball Live (1995) – Live album with Pearl Jam
 A Long Time Now (2001) – Live album with Crazy Horse, tentatively releasing in 2023
 Alchemy (2012–13) – Live album with Crazy Horse
 The Tower – Philadelphia (2018) – Live album
 Polar Vortex'' (2019) – Live album

Notes

External links
 Official Neil Young site
 Official Neil Young Archives site

Live album series
Compilation album series
Neil Young live albums
Neil Young compilation albums
2000s live albums
2000s compilation albums
2010s live albums
2010s compilation albums
Reprise Records compilation albums
Reprise Records live albums